Kent Douglas Paynter (born April 27, 1965) is a Canadian former ice hockey player. Paynter played in the National Hockey League (NHL) from 1985 to 1998.

Playing career

Junior hockey

Kitchener Rangers (1982-1985)
Paynter joined the Kitchener Rangers of the OHL in 1982-83 after he was drafted by the club in the 3rd round, 44th overall, during the 1982 OHL Priority Selection. In his first season with the Rangers, Paynter scored four goals and 15 points in 65 games, helping Kitchener finish second in the Emms Division. In the post-season, Paynter scored a goal in 12 games. Following the season, Paynter was selected in the 8th round, 159th overall, by the Chicago Blackhawks in the 1983 NHL Entry Draft held at the Montreal Forum in Montreal, Quebec.

Paynter returned to the Rangers in the 1983-84 season, in which he saw his offensive production improve. In 65 games, Paynter scored nine goals and 36 points, finishing third among Rangers defensemen in points. In the playoffs, Paynter scored four goals and 13 points in 16 games as the Rangers lost to the Ottawa 67's in the J. Ross Robertson Cup final. As Kitchener hosted the 1984 Memorial Cup, the Rangers were invited to the tournament as the host team. At the tournament, Paynter had three assists in four games. Kitchener once again fell short of the championship, as they lost 7–2 to the 67's in the final game.

Paynter came back to Kitchener for a third season in 1984-85, as he was named as the captain of the Rangers. He helped the rebuilding club reach the post-season, as Paynter scored seven goals and 35 points in 58 games. In four playoff games, Paynter scored two goals and three points.

Professional career

Chicago Blackhawks (1983-1989)
Paynter joined the Chicago Blackhawks after being drafted by the club in the eighth round, 159th overall, in the 1983 NHL Entry Draft. In his first professional season, in 1985-86, Paynter split his time between the Nova Scotia Oilers of the AHL and the Saginaw Generals of the IHL. In 23 games with the Oilers, Paynter had a goal and three points, while in four games with the Generals, Paynter earned an assist.

In 1986-87, Paynter spent the entire season with the Nova Scotia Oilers, scoring two goals and eight points in 66 games with the team. In two playoff games, Paynter was held off the score sheet.

During the 1987-88 season, Paynter spent a majority of it with the Saginaw Hawks of the IHL, scoring eight goals and 28 points in 74 games. In 10 playoff games, Paynter earned an assist. Paynter also spent a short amount of time with the Chicago Blackhawks during the 1987-88 season. On December 5, 1987, Paynter made his NHL debut, as he was held scoreless in a 7–3 loss to the Boston Bruins, while taking a two-minute tripping penalty in the first period. Overall, Paynter appeared in only two NHL games with Chicago, with no points.

The 1988-89 season was mostly spent in the IHL with the Saginaw Hawks. In 69 games, Paynter had 12 goals and 28 points, while accumulating 148 penalty minutes. In six playoff games, Paynter had two goals and four points. Paynter saw very limited action in the NHL during 1988-89 as he was held pointless in one game with the Blackhawks.

Following the 1988–89 season, Paynter became a free agent.

Washington Capitals (1989-1991)
On August 21, 1989, Paynter signed with the Washington Capitals.

Paynter spent most of the 1989-90 season with the Baltimore Skipjacks of the AHL. In 60 games, he scored seven goals and 27 points, and in 11 playoff games, Paynter scored five goals and 11 points. On January 8, 1990, Paynter appeared in his first game with the Washington Capitals, as he didn't earn a point in an 8–6 loss to the Toronto Maple Leafs. On January 16, Paynter earned his first NHL point, an assist, in a 9–6 victory over the New Jersey Devils. On January 31, Paynter scored his first, and only, NHL goal, against Daniel Berthiaume of the Minnesota North Stars in a 4–3 win. In 13 games with the Capitals, Paynter had a goal and three points. On  May 5, Paynter played in his first career NHL playoff game, as he was held with no points, and 10 penalty minutes, in a 3–0 loss to the Boston Bruins. In three playoff games, Paynter was held off the score sheet.

Paynter returned to Baltimore for the 1990-91 season, scoring 10 goals and 27 points in 43 games. In the playoffs with the Skipjacks, Paynter had two goals and three points. Paynter also appeared in one regular season game with Washington during the 1990-91 season, as well as a playoff game, earning no points.

On May 21, 1991, Paynter, Tyler Larter, and Bob Joyce were traded to the Winnipeg Jets for Craig Duncanson, Brent Hughes, and Simon Wheeldon.

Winnipeg Jets (1991-1992)
Paynter joined the Winnipeg Jets for the 1991-92 season. He spent a majority of the 1991-92 season with the Moncton Hawks of the AHL scoring three goals and 33 points in 62 games. In 11 playoff games, Paynter scored two goals and eight points. Paynter played in his first game with Winnipeg on November 25, earning no points in a 3–3 tie against the Calgary Flames. He appeared in five games with Winnipeg, getting no points.

On June 18, 1992, Paynter was claimed by the Ottawa Senators in the 1992 NHL Expansion Draft.

Ottawa Senators (1992-1994)
Paynter spent a majority of the 1992-93 season with the New Haven Senators of the AHL, scoring seven goals and 24 points in 48 games. He appeared in his first game with Ottawa on January 19, earning no points in a 5–2 loss to the Quebec Nordiques. On February 9, Paynter earned 12 penalty minutes in an 8–1 loss to the Philadelphia Flyers. In six games with Ottawa, Paynter had no points and 20 penalty minutes.

Paynter saw most of his playing time with the PEI Senators of the American Hockey League during the 1993-94 season, scoring six goals and 26 points in 63 games. Paynter also played some games with Ottawa. On March 5, Paynter recorded his first point with the Senators, an assist, in a 6–1 loss to the Boston Bruins. In nine games with Ottawa, Paynter had an assist.

Milwaukee Admirals (1994-1998)
Paynter signed with the Milwaukee Admirals of the IHL for the 1994-95 season. In 73 games, he scored three goals and 25 points. In five playoff games, Paynter had two goals and five points.

He returned to the club for the 1995-96 season. Paynter scored nine goals and 28 points in 79 games, then added two assists in five playoff games for the Admirals.

Paynter spent a third season with the Admirals during 1996-97 season. In 77 games, he scored 10 goals and 38 points. In three playoff games, Paynter had a goal and an assist.

He began the 1997-98 season in Milwaukee, as Paynter had six assists in 15 games. Paynter was then traded to the Indianapolis Ice.

Indianapolis Ice (1997-1998)
Paynter finished the 1997-98 season with the Indianapolis Ice. In 37 games, Paynter had three goals and 10 points. In five playoff games, he earned an assist.

Following the season, Paynter announced his retirement.

Career statistics

External links

Profile at hockeydraftcentral.com

1965 births
Baltimore Skipjacks players
Canadian ice hockey defencemen
Chicago Blackhawks draft picks
Chicago Blackhawks players
Ice hockey people from Prince Edward Island
Indianapolis Ice players
Kitchener Rangers players
Living people
Milwaukee Admirals players
Moncton Hawks players
New Haven Senators players
Nova Scotia Oilers players
People from Summerside, Prince Edward Island
Prince Edward Island Senators players
Ottawa Senators players
Saginaw Generals players
Saginaw Hawks players
Washington Capitals players
Winnipeg Jets (1979–1996) players